Kəndəbil (also, Gendabil’ and Gendebil’) is a village and municipality in the Zardab Rayon of Azerbaijan.  It has a population of 786.

References 

Populated places in Zardab District